Le Mariage de mademoiselle Beulemans  is a three-act comedy play written in 1910 by the Belgian playwrights Frantz Fonson and Fernand Wicheler. It is a bourgeois situation comedy of manners and character, and a satire on the aspirations and issues of the lower middle class that emerged in Brussels in the early twentieth-century.

Combining French with the dialect and particular humour of Brussels, the play was an instant success both in its home country and abroad, and has continued to enjoy revivals and been met with a positive audience.  is nowadays widely regarded as an integral piece of Brussels folklore, with its people's good-natured cockiness, and endures as part of the Belgian heritage.

Summary 
The play is set in Brussels, where Suzanne Beulemans, the daughter of a rich brewer is promised to marry Séraphin Meulemeester, the son of a rival brewer. The young man and his father both seem particularly motivated by the dowry of the young fiancée.

But Séraphin has a rival in Albert Delpierre, a young Frenchman who is learning brewery from Ferdinand Beulemans and who is discreetly enamoured with the young woman. Albert learns Séraphin's secret that he is having an affair with a woman worker and that they have had a child. He promises Séraphin that he will never reveal any of it to Suzanne, but she is told by Isabelle, her maid.

Suzanne breaks off the engagement with Séraphin and convinces him to return to the woman he loves and his son. This break-up leads to another dispute: both brewers are hereafter in contention for honorary presidency of the brewers society. Eventually, Suzanne and Albert strive to promote the election of Beulemans which instills him with a deep gratitude toward Albert.

Cast 

Original cast members throughout the first Belgian and French runs featured:
 Lucienne Roger as Suzanne Beulemans, the only Beulemans daughter
 Jacque as Ferdinand Beulemans, Brussels brewer, Suzanne's father
 Vara as Hortense Beulemans, Suzanne's mother
 Jules Berry as Albert Delpierre, young Frenchman employed by Beulemans
 Frémont as Monsieur Delpierre, French shopkeeper, Albert's father and acquaintance of Beulemans
 Merin as Séraphin Meulemeester, Suzanne's fiancé
 Ambreville as Monsieur Meulemeester, Séraphin's father
 Vitry as Isabelle, Maid
 Mylo  as Mostinckx, committee president
 Marmont as Verduren, committee secretary
 Daix as Baron, committee treasurer
 Duro, Delferrière, Nobel, Lennac, Cerrébos as committee members
 Cilly as Octavie, waitress

The production crew included Frantz Fonson as stage director and Albert Dubosq as scenographer.

History 
Most likely inspired both by his familial background and by the work of Belgian novelist Léopold Courouble which depicts the Brusselian life and manners of the Kaekebroeck family, Frantz Fonson penned  in collaboration with his fellow writer Fernand Wicheler, in order to overcome an unexpected canceling of a Parisian theatre company scheduled at Brussels' Théâtre de l'Olympia for spring of 1910.

Premieres 
The play premiered at Brussels' Théâtre de l'Olympia on March 18, 1910, and went on to Paris with the original cast, at Théâtre de la Renaissance on June 7, 1910. It had its first Swiss staging in Geneva the same year.

During the year 1911, while he was undertaking his first tour across South America with the Régnier-Tarride theatre company, Lucien Guitry directed the play's first stage performance outside Europe and interpreted Ferdinand Beulemans' role. It premiered at Rio de Janeiro's Theatro Municipal on the 9th of July. Members of the original French cast included Guitry's wife, Jeanne Desclos, in the role of Suzanne Beulemans, Louis Sance as Albert Delpierre and Gabriel Signoret as M. Meulemeester. An amateur production of the play was simultaneously staged for the first time in Argentina at Buenos Aires by Julian Jaraczewski on behalf of the Belgian photographic association.

Produced by Charles Frohman, the London premiere of the play took place in 1911, at the Globe Theatre on the 16th of September. It was performed in French by the original cast of the Bouffes-Parisiens including Alfred Jacque, Jules Berry and Gilberte Legrand. Le Mariage de mademoiselle Beulemans lasted for sixteen performances at the Globe Theatre and enjoyed some success with London audiences.

In 1912, French producer and actor Paul Derval mounted a tour across former French Algeria.  premiered for the first time in Africa at Algiers' Kursaal on the 27th of September. Belgian actor Balthus performed the role of Ferdinand Beulemans with Belgian actress Yvonne Talbrys in the title role, and entertained French-speaking audiences in various performance halls throughout Algerian cities.

Revivals

Sequels 
In the wake of the play's success, the authors wrote an operetta-like sequel, in three acts and four scenes, entitled: . The music was composed by Arthur van Oost. The operetta was first seen in Brussels at Théâtre royal des Galeries on October 18, 1912, with Yvonne Gay, Alfred Jacque, Berthe Charmal, Georges Foix, Emile Mylo and Nicolas d'Ambreville in major roles.

Tribute 
The success of the play with audiences outside Belgium, despiste its strong local colour, strengthened Marcel Pagnol's will to write his Marseillian trilogy Marius, Fanny, and César. The text of his statement is curated at Brussel's Théâtre royal des Galeries, and remained as the tribute of renown to Fonson and Wicheler's masterpiece.

Adaptations

Settings in French 
In 1927, French film director Julien Duvivier adapted the play for the cinema as a silent film, which starred French film actress Andrée Brabant in the lead role, using the same title. This first screen adaptation premiered the same year at Paris' Electric-Palace-Aubert on the 23rd of September. The play was also adapted to the screen in 1932 by Jean Choux, and in 1950 by André Cerf, who both titled their film just as their predecessor did in 1927.

Pierre Brive adapted the play, to which he gave the same title, for radio, and this version was broadcast on April 9, 1943, as part of the national evening program on Radio Paris.

The French-language division of the Belgian public broadcaster produced and broadcast several television adaptations; with the following casts:
 1967: Christiane Lenain (Suzanne), Jacques Lippe (M. Beulemans), Irène Vernal (Mme Beulemans), Jean-Pierre Loriot (Séraphin), Alain Robert (Albert), Marcel Roels (M. Meulemeester)
 1978: Ania Guédroitz (Suzanne), Jacques Lippe (M. Beulemans), Christiane Lenain (Mme Beulemans), Olivier Monneret (Séraphin), Leonil Mc Cormick (Albert), Robert Roanne (M. Meulemeester)
 1998: Cécile Florin (Suzanne), Raymond Pradel (M. Beulemans), Anne Deroever (Mme Beulemans), Pierre Pigeolet (Séraphin), Damien Gillard (Albert), Robert Roanne (M. Meulemeester) – Production by Théâtre de Montreux (Swiss)
 2004: Cécile Florin (Suzanne), Daniel Hanssens (M. Beulemans), Pascale Vyvère (Mme Beulemans), Pierre Pigeolet (Séraphin), Damien Gillard (Albert), Robert Roanne (M. Meulemeester) Claudie Rion (Isabelle)
 2014: Wendy Piette (Suzanne), Daniel Hanssens (M.Beulemans), Manuel Servais (Mme Beulemans), Denis Carpenters (Seraphin), Damien De Dobbeleer (M Albert), Laure Godisiabois (Isabelle), Pascal Racan (M Delpierre), Michel Poncelet (M Meulemeester), Bernard Lefranc (president), Jean-Paul Clerbois (secretary)
 2014, featured a cast of Belgian television presenters: Caroline Veyt (Suzanne), Guy Lemaire (M. Beulemans), Marie-Hélène Vanderborght (Mme Beulemans), Adrien Devyver (Séraphin), Stéphane Jobert (Albert), Hubert Mestrez (M. Meulemeester), Sara de Paduwa (Isabelle)

Settings in Flemish 
This version of the play was first performed at Antwerp's Koninklijke Nederlandsche Schouwburg at the end of December, 1910. Mmes Bertryn and Ruysbroek, and Messrs Gobau, Laroche and Van Ryn were cast for the leading roles. Some critics felt like Fonson and Wicheler's play was poorly adapted despite the cast's efforts to liven the performance up. Nonetheless, de Graef's adaptation had a greater appeal for the local audience and enjoyed successful revivals.

In the months that followed the outbreak of the First World War,  was staged at various Dutch theatres, with the exiled Flemish theatre troupe of the Antwerp's Koninklijke Vlaamsche Schouwburg. The adapted play, which starred Belgian actress Magda Janssens in the title role, was a runaway success with audiences across the Netherlands and lasted several months during wartime exile. De Graef's adaptation also enjoyed several revivals in Belgium and in the Netherlands over the years, including a 1952 Rotterdam production with Mieke Verstraete and Kees Brusse.

It was subsequently adapted for television by Belgian director Anton Peters with Chris Lomme performing the role of Fientje, produced by the Belgische Radio- en Televisieomroep and aired on March 14, 1974.

In 2002 Roger van de Voorde, stage director for the Brussels Volkstejoêter company, in collaboration with translator Claude Lammens, rewrote the play into Brussels dialect for the Flemish-speaking audiences. The rewritten play, now titled De Traafiest van Mademoiselle Beulemans, was staged partially on a grant from the Flemish Parliament by the Brussels Volkstejoêter company, and premiered at Brussels' Kaaitheater on February 8, 2003. More than  spectators came to see the thirty-eight performances of the play.

Settings in English 
In 1910, Fonson and Wicheler's play was for the first time translated into American English as Suzanne by Charles Haddon Chambers, without any particular adaptation to any singular place and cultural background. It was mounted at the Lyceum in New York by Charles Frohman, with Billie Burke performing the role of Suzanne Beulemans, and received its premiere on the 26th of December of the same year. The play lasted sixty-four performances.

In 1912, Sydney Blow and Douglas Hoare wrote a new English translation and stage adaptation of the Belgian comedy set in the Welsh town of Carmarthen as Little Miss Llewelyn. The play, which starred Hilda Trevelyan in the title role, was produced at the Vaudeville Theatre in London's West End by Norman McKinnel and ran from August 31, 1912, to February 20, 1913, for a total of one hundred and eighty-six performances and achieved popular success.

In 1996, American playwright and translator David Willinger revisited the play, within its original time period, and set the plot in Brooklyn's Yiddish-speaking community. He published this new American English adaptation under the title of Miss Bullberg's Marriage. The play is still to be staged.

Settings in other languages 
Besides inspiring two English adaptations in the authors' lifetime, the play has also been adapted, altered or translated and performed across different countries, and born several editions.

It premiered on the 5th of October of the same year at the Vígszínház, Budapest's grand comedy theatre.

The play was presented and first staged with Galli theatre company in an Italian translation in Rome at the Teatro Valle on January 11, 1911, under the title .

A translated version of the play entitled , by German writer Theodor Ferdinand Bock, was produced at Berlin in 1911.

A Brazilian Portuguese version entitled  was published at Rio de Janeiro following its premiere at the Cinema Rio in August 1913, as translated by Brazilian writer Renato de Castro.

The play, which had its first performance in German in Berlin in 1911, was likewise mounted in German for the Austrian stage at Vienna's Lustspieltheater at the end of 1913 in an adaptation entitled .

It premiered at Istanbul's Tepebaşı Theatre on March 23, 1918, and was first published in Ottoman Turkish in 1920. This version was given in modern Turkish transcription by Atabey Kılıç, and published in April 2016.

This Alsatian dialect stage production resulted in great success with local audiences and enjoyed revivals.

Aside from these translations or adaptations, it was alleged that the play was also adapted and introduced in Japan to a Japanese audience.

About the play 
When Frantz Fonson died in December 1924, the exclusivity over all theatrical adaptations of the play, including professional and amateur, was left to the Théâtre royal des Galeries with his son Lucien as stage director, agreeably to his last will. The play passed into the public domain on the seventieth anniversary of Wicheler's death, in 2006.

Although a number of actors have added their own interpretations to the play, Gustave Libeau and Jacques Lippe are especially noted for their portrayals of Ferdinand Beulemans. Belgian actress Catherine Lenain was the worthy partner of Jacques Lippe and achieved fame in her performance eleven years apart of Beulemans' daughter and wife.

Notes

References

Citations

Bibliography

External links 
 

Belgian plays
1910 plays
Comedy plays
Brussels in fiction
Plays set in Belgium
Plays about marriage
Belgian plays adapted into films